Ugo Attardi (12 March 1923 in Sori – 20 July 2006 in Rome) was an Italian painter, sculptor and writer.

Attardi moved from Genoa to Rome in the early 1950s, where he formed the group Forma 1 together with other artists such as Carla Accardi, Pietro Consagra, Piero Dorazio, Mino Guerrini, Concetto Maugeri, Achille Perilli, Antonio Sanfilippo and Giulio Turcato.

His sculpture of Ulysses is now permanently installed in Battery Park in New York

Main solo exhibitions 

 1976 – Palazzo dei Diamanti, Ferrara
 1981 – Rotonda della Besana, Milan
 1982 – Galerie Faris, Paris
 1983 – Centre Georges Pompidou, Paris
 1984 – Galleria MR, Rome
 1985 – Palazzo Barberini, Rome
 1991 – Palazzo della Penna, Perugia
 1995 – Reale Albergo dei Poveri, Palermo
 1995 – John F. Kennedy International Airport, New York
 1995 – Spazio Italia Art Gallery, New York
 1996 – Alitalia Headquarters, Rome 
 2000 – Centro J. L. Borges, Buenos Aires
 2000 – Galleria Pavilion, Córdoba
 2003 – Palazzo dei Normanni, Palermo
 2005 – Loggiato San Bartolomeo, Palermo
 2011 – Convento del Carmine, Marsala

Main collective exhibitions 

 1947 – Art Club, Rome
 1948 – Art Club, Rome
 1952 – 26° Venice Biennale, Venice
 1954 – 27° Venice Biennale, Venice
 1959 – Rome Quadriennale, Rome
 1965 – Rome Quadriennale, Rome
 1978 – 38° Venice Biennale, Venice
 1982 – FIAC Grand Palais, Paris
 1986 – Rome Quadriennale, Rome
 1992 – Rome Quadriennale, Rome
 2012 – Ulisse Gallery, Rome, Italy

References 

1923 births
2006 deaths
20th-century Italian painters
Italian male painters
21st-century Italian painters
20th-century Italian sculptors
20th-century Italian male artists
20th-century Italian male writers
Italian male sculptors
21st-century Italian sculptors
21st-century Italian male artists
21st-century Italian male writers
Italian contemporary artists
Viareggio Prize winners